Anna Herrmann may refer to:

Anna Herrmann (actor) (born 1987), German actor
Anna Herrmann (politician) (1892–1980), German politician

See also
 Anna Hermann